Ready or Not is a Canadian teen drama television series that aired on the Showtime Movie Channel (April 3, 1993 – 1997) and later on The Disney Channel (April 4, 1996 – 2000) and Global Television Network for five seasons and 65 episodes between 1993 and 1997 in both Canada and the United States.

The show centred on two adolescent girls and their friendship and coming-of-age, addressing difficult topics like divorce, racism, consent, and body image. In June 2021, it was announced the show is in preliminary development for a reboot series.

Premise
The program follows two teenage girls in the suburbs of Toronto, best friends Amanda Zimm and Elizabeth "Busy" Ramone, throughout life's struggles as well as showcasing the different households they grew up in. Amanda is a Jewish Canadian only child raised by liberal former hippie parents including a mother that was into New Age philosophy and often tried to incorporate it into her parenting. Busy, in contrast, is from a more conservative and traditional Italian Canadian Catholic household with three older brothers. Busy and Amanda's personalities and interests are opposites; while Busy is a tomboy who drums and loves sports, Amanda is a girly girl who is boy-crazy and dreams of being a model or actress. The show's 5-year run starts with the girls in grade 6 and ends when they are in grade 9. In the series finale, a flashback shows how Busy and Amanda met as young girls.

Cast

Principals
 Laura Bertram as Amanda Zimm
 Lani Billard as Elizabeth "Busy"  Ramone
 Gail Kerbel as Phyllis Zimm
 John Lefebvre as Leonard Zimm
 Diana Reis as Lucy Ramone
 Gerry Mendicino as Sam Ramone
 Joseph Griffin as Manuel "Manny" Ramone
 Fab Filippo as Dominick "Dom" Ramone (main seasons 1-3, guest season 5)
 Noah Plener as Francis "Frankie" Ramone

Recurring
 Amy Smith as Chrissy Frazer (seasons 1-2)
 Jesse Nilsson as Justin (season 1)
 Omari Moore as Troy Edwards (seasons 1-2)
 Keram Malicki-Sanchez as "The Lizard", "The Liz" (seasons 1, 3-4)
 Keith White as Petrocelli (seasons 1, 3-4)
 Amos Crawley as Bernie Sagittarius "Sag" Chearney (seasons 3-4)
 Ryan Gosling as Matt Kalinsky (season 4)
 Jason Deline as Ernie Lipnit (season 4)
 Tamara Podemski as Carla (seasons 4-5)
 Benjamin Plener as Michael "Monkey Ears" 
 Kari Matchett as Sheila Ramone (seasons 4-5)
 Karl Pruner as Stephen Bennett (season 1)
 Daniel Enright as Milan (season 5)
 Ross Hull as Danny Masters (seasons 2-3)

Development 
In 1988, Alyse Rosenberg wrote a pilot for a show based on her own experience of wearing a bra to school for the first time, saying, "I wrote the series so kids wouldn’t feel so alone. Adolescence is such an incredible period of life. It makes or breaks the sense of self". Two years later, Global Television Network showed interest in her pilot and agreed to produce it. The series originated as a short film, titled Thirty-Two Double A. Eventually the producers saw that the show had the potential to be popular and turned it into a series. Director and screenwriter Nicole Holofcener’s first professional job was writing for the show.

At the time of Ready or Not's original run, there were few shows that showed a realistic portrayal of adolescence. Speaking about the lack of programming for teens and pre-teens, Rosenberg said, “Television has a huge effect on teens, especially on girls, who can be made to feel completely inadequate. We are trying to offer alternative ways to navigate the rocky road of adolescence, without being cutesy". As the series creator and executive producer, Rosenberg "wanted to make sure that the show’s situations about real-life issues mirror real-life responses, which don’t always produce the happiest of endings," saying, "The world is not just black and white".

Legacy 
Ready or Not gained a cult following for being a rare show that depicted adolescence through the perspectives of two female best friends. Kathleen Newman-Bremang of Refinery29 wrote, “For a very specific demo (older Canadian millennials, mostly women), Ready or Not episodes are seared into our brains like Backstreet Boys lyrics or Spice Girls outfits.” The show was notable for depicting situations ranging from interracial relationships, homophobia, bullying, and peer pressure, “and for not shying away from conversations about sex or the societal expectations associated with it.”

It has been compared to My So-Called Life, another 1990s TV show that dealt with similar topics. Though the show Degrassi is the more well-known Canadian teen TV series, Newman-Bremang argued Ready or Not was at times more adept at “navigating life’s big problems with nuance,” commenting, “teen girls are often portrayed on television as one-note bratty caricatures, but Ready or Not gave us two with depth, and the show treated girlhood mistakes with the levity and gravitas they deserve.” In 1996, Ready or Not won a Gemini Award for best youth series. The show has been said to be in development for a reboot.

Episodes

Season 1 (1993)

Season 2 (1994)

Season 3 (1995)

Season 4 (1996)

Season 5 (1997)

Syndication 
In the late 1990s, the Disney Channel began airing Ready or Not in syndication. However, certain episodes Disney felt were inappropriate for their audience, such as “Origins of Man” and “Am I Perverted or What?”, were not aired on the network.

International broadcasts 
In Mexico, the show was dubbed into Spanish as "Tiempos inolvidables" and aired on Televisa from 1996 to 2001.
In the Czech Republic, the show was dubbed into Czech as "Připraveny nebo ne" and aired in the late 1990s.
In Australia, the show aired on ABC TV and was shown every Friday at 5:30pm. It debuted in 1994 and again aired from 1996 to 1998. It was also shown on weekday mornings at 11:30am during the school holidays between 1997 and 1998.
In Nigeria, the show aired on RSTV, a regional TV channel serving the southern city of Portharcout and neighbouring states. It was shown on Friday at 5:00pm, at the end of a kids block known as K-Time. It aired in 2005 to 2006.
In Brazil, the series was shown by Rede Globo, first on Saturday afternoons, in 1994, after Xuxa Park. Subsequently, it began to be shown in the early hours of Friday to Saturday.
In Italy, the show was dubbed into Italian as "Siete pronti?" and aired on Disney Channel Italy  in the late 1990s.

References

External links

1993 Canadian television series debuts
1997 Canadian television series endings
1990s Canadian teen drama television series
Global Television Network original programming
Disney Channel original programming
Television series by Corus Entertainment
Television shows set in Toronto
Television shows filmed in Toronto
English-language television shows
Television series about teenagers
Television series by Insight Productions
Canadian Screen Award-winning television shows
Works about puberty
Works about adolescence
Coming-of-age television shows